Turris gilchristi is an extinct species of sea snail, a marine gastropod mollusk in the family Turridae, the turrids.

Description

Distribution
Fossils of this marine species were found in Miocene strata in Kerala, India (age range:23.03 to 15.97 Ma)

References

 A. K. Dey. 1961. The Miocene Mollusca from Quilon, Kerala (India). Palaeontologica Indica 36

gilchristi
Gastropods described in 1961